The R124 road is a regional road in Fingal, Ireland.

The official description of the R124 from the Roads Act 1993 (Classification of Regional Roads) Order 2012  reads:

R124: Snugborough - Malahide, County Dublin

Between its junction with R123 at Snugborough and its junction with R106 at The Mall Malahide via Hazelbrook; and Church Road at Malahide all in the county of Fingal.

See also
Roads in Ireland
National primary road
National secondary road
Regional road

References

Regional roads in the Republic of Ireland
Roads in County Dublin